Calectasia narragara, commonly known as a blue tinsel lily or star of Bethlehem, is a plant in the family Dasypogonaceae growing as a tufted rhizomatous herb. It is endemic to the south-west of Western Australia and common in most of its range.

Description
Calectasia narragara is an undershrub without stilt roots but with a short rhizome from which it is able to form clones. The roots are clustered, wiry and sand-binding. The outer part of the petals are blue with bronze margins and spread outwards to form a papery, star-like pattern which fades to white with age. In the centre of the star are six yellow stamens forming a tube which turns orange-red with age. The thin style sometimes extends beyond the stamens. It is similar to the other species of Calectasia and is distinguished from them by a combination of the presence of a short, compact rhizome, lack of stilt leaves, the glabrousness of the leaf blades and the change in colour of the petals and stamens with age. Flowers mostly appear from June to September.

Taxonomy and naming
Calectasia narragara is one of eleven species in the genus Calectasia. It was described as a new species in 2001 by R.L. Barrett and K.W. Dixon from a specimen collected in Kings Park, near the nature trail, 0.5 km west of the Roe Memorial. (The Roe Memorial commemorates John Septimus Roe, Western Australia's first surveyor-general.)

The specific epithet (narragara) is a composite Nyoongar name for a star, chosen for the common name of "Star of Bethlehem" which has often been applied to this species.

Distribution and habitat
This species of blue tinsel lily is widespread and common within 80 kilometres of the coast on the Swan Coastal Plain and Darling Scarp from Busselton north to Geraldton, in the South West Botanical Province. It usually grows in a wide range of vegetation associations and habitats, including kwongan, woodland on white, grey or yellow sand and occasionally in swampy areas.

Conservation status
Calectasia narragara is classified as not threatened.

References

External links

narragara
Endemic flora of Western Australia
Commelinids of Australia
Plants described in 2001
Taxa named by Russell Lindsay Barrett